Hossein Hooshyar is an Iranian football goalkeeper and goalkeeping coach.

Club career

Payam Khorasan
He was member of Payam Khorasan youth system in 2000–06. He joined Payam Mashhad in 2006.

Shahrdari Yasuj
He joined Shahrdari Yasuj in 2011 and his appearances made impression in 2011–12 Hazfi Cup when he saved 5 Penalties in 2 game against Tractor Sazi and Foolad. In semifinal game, he also played well against Esteghlal.

Persepolis
He joined Persepolis in January 2012, signing a 30-month contract lasting until end of 2013–14 season but after a disappointing showing, It was announced that he will be leave the club at the end of the season.
His most important sport game was the Tehran 75 derby, which ended in Persepolis' favor with a hat-trick by Éamon Zayed

Club career statistics

Honours
Payam Khorasan
 Azadegan League : Champion 2007–08
Shahrdari Yasuj
Hazfi Cup : Semi Final 2011–12

External links
 Mohammad Hossein Hooshyar at PersianLeague

Iranian footballers
Living people
1984 births
Persepolis F.C. players
F.C. Aboomoslem players
Association football goalkeepers